Tara Prasad Bahinipati (born 30 December 1956) is an Indian politician from Odisha. He is currently serving as an MLA in Odisha Legislative Assembly. In 2000, 2004, 2014 and 2019, he was elected to the 12th , 13th, 15th and 16th Odisha Legislative Assembly from Koraput and Jeypore Assembly constituencies respectively.

Tara Prasad Bahinipati was born on 30 December 1956. His father's name is Anantaram Bahinipati and his mother's name is Sarojini Bahinipati. He is currently serving as Member of the Odisha Legislative Assembly from the Jeypore Assembly constituency. He was the President of ODISHA POLICE, OSAP, HAVILDAR, CONSTABLE & SEPOY CONFEDERATION from 1985-1993.

Controversies 
In January 2023,  he was caught on camera engaging in Public display of affection with his wife at a public event. 

In November 2019, Bahinipati created a lighthearted moment by blowing a flying kiss to Speaker Surjya Narayan Patro. He later clarified that the gesture was not meant to be disrespectful to the speaker but was instead a symbol of gratitude for being able to bring attention to issues in his constituency.

References 

Odisha MLAs 2019–2024
Odisha MLAs 2000–2004
Indian National Congress politicians from Odisha
Year of birth missing (living people)
Living people
People from Jeypore
Odisha MLAs 2004–2009
Odisha MLAs 2014–2019